Feed the Machine is a 2017 album by Nickelback.

Feed the Machine may also refer to:

 "Feed the Machine" (Red song), a 2011 song by American rock band Red
 "Feed the Machine" (Nickelback song), a 2017 song by Canadian rock band Nickelback
 "Feed the Machine", a 1993 song by Icehouse from Big Wheel
 "Feed the Machine", a 2001 song by Quiet Riot from Guilty Pleasures

See also
Feed the Machine Tour, an upcoming 2017 tour by Nickelback